Thomas Barr Courtice (born October 31, 1943) was the president of Ohio Wesleyan University between 1994 and 2004. He received degrees from the University of Pittsburgh, Indiana University, and the University of Minnesota. Prior to becoming president of Ohio Wesleyan, he served for eight years as president of West Virginia Wesleyan College.

Courtice has also served as president of the North Coast Athletic Conference.

Formerly president of Academic Search located in Washington, D.C., he was also a search consultant for AGB Search in Washington, DC.

References

External links
A news story containing an image of Courtice

Presidents of Ohio Wesleyan University
Living people
University of Minnesota alumni
1943 births